The 2013 European Cup Winter Throwing was held on 16 and 17 March at the Pista de Atletismo Universitat Jaume I and Complejo Deportivo Gaetà Huguet in Castellón, Spain. It was the thirteenth edition of the athletics competition in throwing events and was jointly organised by the European Athletic Association and the Real Federación Española de Atletismo. The competition featured men's and women's contests in shot put, discus throw, javelin throw and hammer throw. In addition to the senior competitions, there were also under-23 events for younger athletes. A total of 249 athletes from 38 nations entered the competition. It was the second time that Spain hosted the event, following on from the 2009 edition held in Tenerife.

Mariya Abakumova provided the highlight of the first day of competition, winning the women's javelin in a cup record and world-leading mark of 69.34 metres. Daniel Jasinski narrowly won the men's discus, beating 41-year-old Virgilijus Alekna by three centimetres. Krisztián Pars and Yevgeniya Kolodko were comfortable winners in the hammer throw and shot put, respectively. In the under-23 section Valeriy Iordan won with a javelin championship record of 82.89 m – the best by any athlete in the cup.

The best performance on the second day came from Nadine Müller, who won the discus with a world-leading 66.69 m. Borja Vivas won the only gold medal for the host country Spain in the men's shot puts, reaching twenty metres. The women's hammer contest was close with Zalina Marghieva beating the reigning Olympic champion Tatyana Lysenko with a throw of 71.98 m. The world junior record holder in the javelin, Zigismunds Sirmais, marked his transition from the junior ranks by winning the senior title. In the under-23 section Turkey's Emel Dereli won the women's shot put at the age of seventeen.

Medal summary

Senior men

Senior women

Under-23 men

Under-23 women

References

External links
Competition website at RFEA
Competition website at European Athletics

European Throwing Cup
European Cup Winter Throwing
Winter Throwing
International athletics competitions hosted by Spain
Sport in Castellón de la Plana